Jean-Daniel Dätwyler (born 2 April 1945) is a Swiss former alpine skier and Olympic medalist. He received a bronze medal in the downhill at the 1968 Winter Olympics in Grenoble.

See also
 Villars-sur-Ollon

References

External links

1945 births
Living people
Swiss male alpine skiers
Olympic alpine skiers of Switzerland
Alpine skiers at the 1968 Winter Olympics
Olympic bronze medalists for Switzerland
Olympic medalists in alpine skiing
Medalists at the 1968 Winter Olympics
20th-century Swiss people